Punjabi Hindus are adherents of Hinduism who identify linguistically, culturally, and genealogically as Punjabis and are natives of the Punjab region of the Indian Subcontinent. While Punjabi Hindus are mostly found in the Indian state of Punjab today, many have ancestry from the greater Punjab region, which was partitioned between India and Pakistan in 1947. Apart from Indian Punjab, Punjabi Hindus also settled in the Indian states of Haryana, Himachal Pradesh, Uttarakhand, Delhi, Chandigarh, Rajasthan, Maharashtra etc.

History

Ancient 

Hinduism is the oldest recorded religion practiced in Punjab. The historical Vedic religion of the Vedic period (1500–500 BCE) constituted the religious ideas and practices in Punjab, and centred primarily in the worship of Indra, the Hindu god of heaven and lightning. The Vedic tribes moved further eastwards in the northern Indus Valley and towards the Ganges-Yamuna doab during the late Vedic Period, and Brahminism developed out of the Vedic origins in the Kurukshetra area. The religion of the Vedic Period is one of the precursors of Hinduism, and the Vedic period ended when the Hindu synthesis developed out of the interaction between Brahminism, Sramanism, and local religions.

The bulk of the Rigveda was composed in the Punjab region between circa 1500 and 1200 BCE, while later Vedic scriptures were composed more eastwards, between the Yamuna and Ganges rivers. An ancient Indian law book called the Manusmriti, developed by Brahmin Hindu priests, shaped Punjabi religious life from 200 BCE onward.

British colonial era 

Prominent Indian nationalists from Punjab, such as Lala Lajpat Rai, belonged to the Arya Samaj. The Arya Samaj, a Hindu reformist  sect was active in propagating their message in Punjab.
In  the early part of the 20th century, the Samaj and organisations inspired by it, such as Jat Pat Todak Mandal, were active in campaigning against caste discrimination. Other activities in which the Samaj engaged included campaigning for the acceptance of widow remarriage and women's education.

During the colonial era, the practice of religious syncretism among Punjabi Hindus and Punjabi Muslims was noted and documented by officials in census reports:

1947 Partition 
Approximately 3 million Punjabi Hindus migrated from West Punjab and North-West Frontier Province (present-day Pakistan) to East Punjab and Delhi (present-day India) during the Partition.

This split the former British province of Punjab between the Dominion of India and the Dominion of Pakistan. The mostly Muslim western part of the province became Pakistan's Punjab province; the mostly Sikh and Hindu eastern part became India's East Punjab state (later divided into the new states of Punjab, Haryana and Himachal Pradesh). Many Hindus and Sikhs lived in the west, and many Muslims lived in the east, and the fears of all such minorities were so great that the Partition saw many people displaced and much intercommunal violence. Some have described the violence in Punjab as a retributive genocide.

The newly formed governments had not anticipated, and were completely unequipped for, a two-way migration of such staggering magnitude, and massive violence and slaughter occurred on both sides of the new India-Pakistan border. Estimates of the number of deaths vary, with low estimates at 200,000 and high estimates at 2,000,000. The worst case of violence among all regions is concluded to have taken place in Punjab.

Punjabi Suba and trifurcation of Punjab 

After Partition, Sikh leaders and political parties demanded a "Punjabi Suba" (Punjabi Province) where Punjabi language written in the Sikh Gurumukhi script would be the language of the state in North India.

At the instigation of the Arya Samaj, many Punjabi Hindus in present-day Ambala, Una, and Sirsa stated Hindi as their mother tongue in the censuses of 1951 and 1961. Some areas of the erstwhile East Punjab state where Hindi, Haryanvi and Western Pahari speaking Hindus formed the majority became part of the newly created states of Haryana and Himachal Pradesh where Hindi was declared the state language. This was in contrast with the primarily Punjabi-speaking locals in some regions of the newly created states. A direct result of the trifurcation of East Punjab into three states made Punjab a Sikh-majority state in India. Today, Punjabi Hindus make up approximately 38.5% population of present Punjab State of India.

Demographics

India 

In the Indian state of Punjab, Punjabi Hindus make up approximately 38.5% of the state's population and are a majority in the Doaba region. Punjabi Hindus form a majority in five districts of Punjab, namely, Pathankot, Jalandhar, Hoshiarpur, Fazilka and Shaheed Bhagat Singh Nagar districts.

During the 1947 partition, many Hindus from West Punjab and North-West Frontier Province settled in Delhi. Determined from 1991 and 2015 estimates, Punjabi Hindus form approximately 24 to 35 percent of Delhi's population; based on 2011 official census counts, this amounts to between 4,029,106 and 5,875,779 people.

Pakistan 

Following the large-scale exodus that took place during the 1947 partition, there remains a small Punjabi Hindu community in Pakistan today. According to the 2017 Census, there are about 200,000 Hindus in Punjab province, forming approximately 0.2% of the total population. Much of the community resides in the primarily rural South Punjab districts of Rahim Yar Khan and Bahawalpur where they form 3.12% and 1.12% of the population respectively, while the rest are concentrated in urban centres such as Lahore.

Diaspora 
Large diaspora communities exist in many countries including in Canada, Australia, the United States, and the United Kingdom.

Culture and religion 

As in many other parts of India, Hinduism in Punjab has adapted over time and has become a synthesis of culture and history. It centres on using Dharma to purify the soul (Atman) and to connect with a greater "eternal energy" (Paramātmā).

As Hindus believe that Dharma is universal and evolves with time, many Hindus also value other spiritual paths and religious traditions. They believe that any traditions that are equally able to nurture one's Atman should be accepted and taught. Hinduism itself encourages any being to reach their own self-realization in their own unique way either through Bhagavan or through other means of devotion and meditation.

The Punjabi Hindus continue heterogeneous religious practices in spiritual kinship with Sikhism. This not only includes veneration of the Sikh Gurus in private practice but also visits to Sikh Gurdwaras in addition to Hindu temples.

Udasis 
Udasi is a religious sect of ascetic sadhus centered in Punjab Region. The Udasis were key interpreters of the Sikh philosophy and the custodians of important Sikh shrines until the Akali movement. They brought many converts into the Sikh fold during the 18th and the early 19th centuries. However, their religious practices border on a syncretism of Sikhism and Hinduism. When the Singh Sabha, dominated by Tat Khalsa Sikhs, redefined the Sikh identity in the early 20th century, the Udasi mahants were expelled from the Sikh shrines. Since then, the Udasis have increasingly regarded themselves as Hindus rather than Sikhs.

See also 

History of Punjab
 Hinduism in Punjab, Pakistan
 Hinduism and Sikhism
 List of Hindu temples in India
 Bhabra
 List of Hindu festivals in Punjab
 East Punjab

Notes

References

Further reading

External links 
 The Punjab—An Overview
 Punjab History
 Punjab Historical Background
 Shri Durgiana Tirath

 
Hinduism in India
Hinduism in Punjab, Pakistan
Hindu ethnic groups
Hindu communities
Social groups of Delhi
Social groups of Punjab, India
Social groups of India
Social groups of Pakistan